For the ancient port, see Muza Emporion

Mawza District is a district of the Taiz Governorate, Yemen. As of 2003, the district had a population of 119,818 inhabitants.

History
Mawza'a was the regional capital of Mofar in ancient Yemen, the king of Mawza African trading colony was mentioned in the Periplus of the Erythraean Sea

Jewish Exile 
During the rise of the expansion of the Zaydi state when Mawza was part of the kingdom, most of the Yemenite Jews were expelled to Mawza' (1679-1680) in what became known by Yemenite Jews as the Mawza Exile

Mocha Port 
During the Mawza Exile, Mocha 12 miles west of Mawza was the main port of the Zaydi imamate & Muza lost its status as the regional port of Mofar.

References

Districts of Taiz Governorate